Proeidosa is a genus of skipper butterflies in the family Hesperiidae.

Species
Proeidosa polysema Lower, 1908

References
Natural History Museum Lepidoptera genus database
Proeidosa at funet

Trapezitinae
Hesperiidae genera